Robert Lilburne (1613–1665) was an English Parliamentarian soldier, the older brother of John Lilburne, the well known Leveller. Unlike his brother, who severed his relationship with Oliver Cromwell, Robert Lilburne remained in the army. He is also classed as a regicide for having been a signatory to the death warrant of King Charles I in 1649. He was forty-seventh of the fifty nine Commissioners.

Civil War 

At the outbreak of the First English Civil War Lilburne joined the Roundheads. He served under Edward Montagu (the son of Earl of Manchester) and by 1644 had attained the rank of captain.  He then raised a regiment of horse in County Durham which became part of Lord Fairfax's Northern Association army. He joined the New Model Army and was promoted to Colonel of a regiment.

Although like his brother John, his sympathies like those of his regiment lay with the Levellers, he was not present at the Corkbush Field rendezvous, the first of several meetings planned following the Putney Debates. Robert Lilburne's regiment marched, without orders, to the rendezvous in the hope of pressing the Levellers manifesto, the Agreement of the People, on the Army. The mutiny failed. Along with copies of the Agreement, the soldiers displayed in their hats papers showing the Levellers' slogan, "England's Freedom, Soldiers' Rights". When an officer of the commander of the Army, Sir Thomas Fairfax approached them, members of Lilburne's  regiment stoned and wounded him. Oliver Cromwell, then the second-in-command of the New Model Army, and some of his officers rode into their ranks and ordered them to take the papers from their hat bands. Cromwell had eight or nine of the more truculent of Lilburne's troopers arrested, tried at an improvised court-martial, and found guilty of mutiny. Three ringleaders were sentenced to death and, having cast lots, Private Richard Arnold was shot on the spot as an example.

Despite this incident, Fairfax appointed Lilburne Governor of Newcastle-upon-Tyne. During the Second English Civil War, Lilburne joined Cromwell and Lambert in the defeat of the Engagers at the Battle of Preston. In December 1648, Lilburne was nominated as one of the Commissioners at the trial of Charles I, he attended the trial and signed the king's death warrant. He also took part in the siege of Pontefract Castle, which held out against Parliament until March 1649.

During the Third English Civil War he fought under Oliver Cromwell during his Scottish campaign, and when the Scottish army invaded England Lilburne defeated English Royalists, under the command of the Earl of Derby, at the Battle of Wigan Lane on 25 August 1651. This prevented them from joining the Scots on their march to defeat at the Battle of Worcester and the end of the English Civil Wars. In  November 1651 he returned to Scotland as part of Major-General Richard Deane's army of occupation. In  December 1652, Lilburne took over command of the army in Scotland, but when he was not given promotion or the support he thought he needed from the Government in London to put down the Glencairn's uprising, he was happy to hand over command to General George Monck in early 1654.

Interregnum 

During the Interregnum although some officers said that he was too sympathetic to the Levellers and the Anabaptists, he supported Oliver Cromwell during first years of the Protectorate. In 1654 he was appointed Governor of York and the next year he commanded the army units that put down the Sealed Knot uprising in York. In 1654 he was elected MP for County Durham in the First Protectorate Parliament. During the Rule of the Major-Generals (1656) he was deputy to John Lambert responsible for the day-to-day administration of Yorkshire and County Durham. He was elected MP for the East Riding of Yorkshire in the Second Protectorate Parliament. However he opposed the offer of the crown to Cromwell and was uneasy with the constitutional arrangements of the later Protectorate.

Restoration
With the death of Oliver Cromwell, Lilburne did not support Richard Cromwell but instead supported the restoration of the Rump Parliament and the reinstatement of the English Commonwealth. He was appointed to the  Army's Committee of Safety and supported General John Lambert when Lambert marched to stop General George Monck marching on London. When that failed and the Restoration occurred Lilburne was arrested along with all the other regicides still living in Britain. On 16 October 1660 Lilburne was found guilty of high treason, and was sentenced to be hanged, drawn and quartered, but later this was commuted to life imprisonment. He died a prisoner on Drake's Island in Plymouth Sound in August, 1665.

Family
Lilburne married Margaret, daughter of Richard Beke of Hadenham, Buckinghamshire, with whom he had three sons who survived him.

Notes

References

 Spartacus: Robert Lilburne
 Biography of Robert Lilburne British Civil Wars and Commonwealth website

1613 births
1665 deaths
New Model Army personnel
Regicides of Charles I
People educated at the Royal Grammar School, Newcastle upon Tyne
Prisoners who died in England and Wales detention
Prisoners sentenced to death by England and Wales
Prisoners sentenced to life imprisonment by England and Wales
English MPs 1654–1655
English MPs 1656–1658
English politicians convicted of crimes
Parliamentarian military personnel of the English Civil War
People convicted of treason against England